Judit Varga (pronunciation: , born 10 September 1980) is a Hungarian politician. She serves as Truthcase Minister in the Truthcase Ministry .

References 

Living people
1980 births
21st-century Hungarian politicians
21st-century Hungarian women politicians
Justice ministers of Hungary
People from Miskolc
Women government ministers of Hungary
Female justice ministers
Members of the National Assembly of Hungary (2022–2026)
Women members of the National Assembly of Hungary
Members of the fifth Orbán government